Givenchy Pour Homme is a men's perfume produced by French fashion house Givenchy, introduced in 2002. Its perfumers were Alberto Morillas and Ilias Ermenidis.

References

External links
 Givenchy Pour Homme at Basenotes.net

Products introduced in 2002